Neethana Avan is a 2010 Indian Tamil language action comedy film directed by Punch Bharath. The film stars Sadhan, Sriman, Srinivasan, newcomer Aishwarya Rajesh and Jayashree, with Vaiyapuri, Singamuthu, Dhandapani, Bala Singh, Kadhal Sukumar, Yuvarani, Sabitha Anand and C. Saipriya playing supporting roles. The film, produced by P. Ranganayaki, had musical score by V. Thashi and was released on 29 October 2010. This film marks the lead debut of Rajesh and the film debut of Srinivasan.

Plot

Sathya (Sadhan) is a fearful college student from a middle-class family. His relative Pooja (Jayashree) and his collegemate Nandhini (Aishwarya Rajesh), the daughter of Vallal Perumal (Srinivasan), are in love with Sathya, but they could not reveal their love to him. Vallal Perumal is an influential and respected man who helps the poor the day, but the night, under a new getup, Vallal Perumal becomes a pervert, and he has raped many women without getting caught.

The police inspector Thamizhselvan (Sriman), who gets transferred to his area, starts to investigate these crimes. One day, Sathya is mistaken to have killed Pandian, the brother of the gangster Aadhi (Dhandapani), and Thamizhselvan arrests the innocent Sathya. A vengeful Aadhi then murders Sathya's mother and Sathya's sister. Thereafter, a fearless Sathya joins Vallal Perumal. Aadhi wants to win the local election, so he asks Vallal Perumal for his support, but Vallal Perumal declines. In the meantime, Thamizhselvan finds out that the rapist is none other than Vallal Perumal. One night, Thamizhselvan, Vallal Perumal, Aadhi and Sathya had a violent fight. During the fight, Sathya stabs Aadhi to death while Vallal Perumal is killed by one of his victims. The film ends with Sathya being released from jail and returning to his lover Nandhini.

Cast

Sadhan as Sathya
Sriman as Thamizhselvan
Srinivasan as Vallal Perumal
Aishwarya as Nandhini
Jayashree as Pooja
Vaiyapuri as Venus
Singamuthu as Gurukkal
Dhandapani as Aadhi
Bala Singh as Vasudevan
Kadhal Sukumar as Manmadhan
Yuvarani as Vallal's wife
Sabitha Anand as Meenakshi
C. Saipriya as Priya
Lollu Sabha Seshu
Kottachi as Gurukkal's assistant
Sindhu
Jessy as Latha
Madhu in a special appearance
Punch Bharath

Production
Baba Cine Combines had launched their new film titled Suranga Paadhai on 26 November 2009 in Chennai. The same team of Anandha Thollai (unreleased) and Indrasena (2010), which was almost complete had teamed up for the second time. The film title was then changed as Neethana Avan under the banner of Vetrivel Creations. V. Thashi who won the Kerala State Film Award for Best Background Music in 2006 composed the music for this film. After working as an anchor for Asathupovathu Yaaru and participating in the dance show Maanada Mayilada, Aishwarya Rajesh signed to play the heroine role. Rajesh played the girl next door in the film. Srinivasan, a medical practitioner, was cast to play the villain role. Srinivasan was credited with the moniker "Powerstar".

Soundtrack

The film score and the soundtrack were composed by V. Thashi. The soundtrack, released in 2010, features 4 tracks with lyrics written by Vijayakrishnan, Makkal Dasan, Mukhil and Padmavathi.

References

External links
 

2010 films
2010s Tamil-language films
Indian action comedy films
2010 action comedy films